The College of William & Mary fraternity and sorority system recognizes chapters of national organizations belonging to the Panhellenic Council, the Interfraternity Council (IFC) and the National Pan-Hellenic Council, and also recognizes one local fraternity without Greek letters (Queens' Guard) and the local chapter of one national fraternity (Kappa Sigma) that abandoned membership in an inter-Greek consortium. The school also offers a variety of honor and co-ed service fraternities as well. The first collegiate fraternity within the present borders of the United States, the Latin-letter F.H.C. Society, was founded at the College of William & Mary on November 11, 1750.  The new country's first Greek-letter fraternity was founded at the College on December 5, 1776, though the Phi Beta Kappa Society no longer is a social fraternity but, instead, the leading American academic honor society.  Some fraternities and sororities are limited to graduate students at William & Mary, while others may only be joined at the undergraduate level.  Still other Greek-letter organizations operate without recognition or approval from college administrators.

In the Autumn of 2013, 11 new fraternity houses and a Greek community center were opened.  Each of the 11 new houses accommodates 17 men.

Six fraternities previously lived in fraternity houses located on campus in a complex of interconnected buildings known as "The Units".  Each house, which can hold up to 36 residents, opens onto a patio and holds a large social room for official fraternity events.  These buildings have now been converted into freshman dormitories known as the "Green and Gold Village".  Before erection of the new fraternity houses, one on-campus fraternity, Alpha Epsilon Pi, was located in the lodges (which served as fraternity houses after the Second World War, then were used for classrooms and faculty offices), and the Delta Phi fraternity had retained its own house on Armistead Avenue, adjacent to sorority court.  After the new fraternity buildings were opened, Delta Phi acquired one of the 11 new fraternity houses and Alpha Epsilon Pi took over Delta Phi's old house on Armistead Avenue.

All sororities are located near the Old Campus of the College, in a complex known as "Sorority Court", on Richmond Road directly across from the Wren Building and the President's House. There are twelve individual houses in the complex. Sorority Court is within walking distance of Merchants Square in Colonial Williamsburg and of the campus quadrangle known as the Sunken Garden.

At the end of the 2007–08 academic calendar year, 25% of undergraduate men and 27% of undergraduate women participated in the Greek system. The average fraternity size was 38 while the average sorority size was 70.

Note: Numbers after the dashes indicate the fraternity's or sorority's year of its national founding.

IFC social fraternities 

Alpha Epsilon Pi (ΑΕΠ) – 1913
Alpha Sigma Phi (ΑΣΦ) – 1845
Alpha Tau Omega (ΑΤΩ) – 1865
Beta Theta Pi (ΒΘΠ) – 1839
Delta Chi (ΔΧ) – 1890
Kappa Alpha Order (ΚΑ) – 1865
Kappa Delta Rho (ΚΔΡ) – 1905
Kappa Sigma (ΚΣ) - 1869
Lambda Chi Alpha (ΛΧΑ) – 1909
Phi Gamma Delta (ΦΓΔ or FIJI) - 1848
Psi Upsilon (ΨΥ) – 1833
Sigma Alpha Epsilon (ΣΑΕ) – 1856
Sigma Chi (ΣΧ) – 1855
Sigma Phi Epsilon (ΣΦΕ) – 1901
Sigma Pi (ΣΠ) – 1897

Suspended or inactive fraternities 
Delta Phi (ΔΦ) – 1827 (Separated  since 2020)*
Pi Kappa Alpha (ΠΚΑ) – 1868 (Suspended since 2019)
Phi Kappa Tau (ΦΚΤ) – 1906 (Inactive since 2019)
Chi Phi (ΧΦ) – 1824 (Inactive since 2015)
Theta Delta Chi (ΘΔΧ) – 1847 (Inactive since 2012) 
Sigma Nu (ΣΝ) – 1869 
Pi Lambda Phi (ΠΛΦ) – 1895

Panhellenic social sororities 

Alpha Chi Omega (ΑΧΩ) – 1885
Chi Omega (ΧΩ) – 1895
Delta Delta Delta (ΔΔΔ) – 1888
Delta Gamma (ΔΓ) – 1873
Gamma Phi Beta (ΓΦΒ) – 1874
Kappa Alpha Theta (ΚΑΘ) – 1870
Kappa Delta (ΚΔ) – 1897
Kappa Kappa Gamma (ΚΚΓ) – 1870
Phi Mu (ΦΜ) – 1852 
Pi Beta Phi (ΠΒΦ) – 1867

Suspended or inactive sororities

National Pan-Hellenic Council fraternities and sororities 
Alpha Phi Alpha (ΑΦΑ) – 1906
Alpha Kappa Alpha (ΑΚΑ) – 1908
Delta Sigma Theta (ΔΣΘ) – 1913
Kappa Alpha Psi (ΚΑΨ) – 1911
Phi Beta Sigma (ΦΒΣ) – 1914
Sigma Gamma Rho (ΣΓΡ) – 1922
Zeta Phi Beta (ΖΦΒ) – 1920
Omega Psi Phi (ΩΨΦ) - 1911

Multicultural Greek Council fraternities and sororities 
Delta Phi Omega (ΔΦΩ) – 1998
Sigma Iota Alpha (SIA) – 1990

Honor and service fraternities and sororities 

Alpha Kappa Psi (ΑΚΨ) – 1904; co-ed professional business fraternity
Alpha Lambda Delta (ΑΛΔ) – 1924; co-ed freshman year honor society
Alpha Phi Omega (ΑΦΩ) – 1925; co-ed service fraternity
Alpha Psi Omega (ΑΨΏ) – 1925; co-ed theatre fraternity
Beta Gamma Sigma (ΒΓΣ) – 1913; co-ed business fraternity
Delta Omicron (ΔΟ) – 1909; co-ed music fraternity
Eta Sigma Phi (ΗΣΦ) – 1924; co-ed classical honor society
Kappa Delta Pi (ΚΔΠ) – 1911; co-ed international education honor society
Nu Kappa Epsilon (NKE) – 1994; female-only music sorority*
Phi Alpha Delta (ΦΑΔ) – 1902; co-ed professional law fraternity
Phi Alpha Theta (ΦΑΘ) – 1921; co-ed history honor society
Phi Beta Delta (ΦΒΔ) – 1986; co-ed international studies honor society
Phi Beta Kappa (ΦΒΚ) – 1776; co-ed academic honor society*
Phi Eta Sigma (ΦΗΣ) – 1923; co-ed freshman honor society
Phi Mu Alpha (ΦΜΑ) – 1898; male-only musical social fraternity
Phi Sigma Pi (ΦΣΠ) – 1916; co-ed academic honor society
Pi Delta Phi (ΠΔΦ) – 1967; co-ed French honor society
Pi Gamma Mu (ΠΓΜ) – 1924; co-ed social sciences honor society*
Pi Sigma Alpha (ΦΣΑ) – 1920; co-ed political science honor society
Psi Chi (ΨΧ) – 1929; co-ed psychology honor society
Sigma Gamma Epsilon (ΣΓΕ) – 1915; co-ed earth sciences honor society

*Original charter founded at the College of William & Mary

References

External links
Fraternity Complex floor plans
Sorority Court housing and floor layout

College of William & Mary student life
College of William and Mary